Srutimala Duara (– 27 February 2023) was an Indian academician and bilingual writer from Assam. She wrote novels, short stories, and children's literature in English and Assamese, and poetry in English. She was an associate professor and head of the English department of Handique Girls College, Guwahati. In 2021, she was awarded the Indian Women Achievers Award in Literature by the Asian Literary Society.

Biography
Duara published novels, collections of short stories, children's literature, and essay collections in English and Assamese. She also wrote six anthologies of poetry in English.

She was an Associate Professor and head of the department of English of Handique Girls College, Guwahati.

Duara was a founder member and has been the secretary and treasurer of Northeast Writers' Forum, an organization with eight chapters in the Northeast of India.

Duara also recited poetry, and her CD of recited Assamese poetry "Ekajoli Kobita" was released in 2015. She has recited and acted in two poetry videos "Smriti" and "Sagar" published on YouTube.

Duara also wrote for The Times of India, The Hindu, and The Assam Tribune.

Duara died from ovarian cancer on 27 February 2023, at the age of 57.

Awards and honours
Duara was awarded the "Naari Shakti Award" by Lions Club in April 2015. In 2016, she received the "Woman of the Year" award from the International Human Rights Council, Assam Chapter. In 2021, she was awarded the Indian Women Achievers Award in Literature by the Asian Literary Society.

Bibliography

Novels
 Traveling with Dreams (Spectrum, 2001)
 Maya's Party (BR Publishing Corp, 2003)
 Ashes in the Seas (BR Pub Corp, 2003)

Short story collections
 The Sunset and Other Stories (Spectrum, 1998)
 Waiting for the Last Breath (Spectrum, 1999)
 The Jhoolan Evening (Spectrum, 2000)

Poetry collections
 By the Brahmaputra and Other Poems (2018)
 Along my Route (2020)

Children's books
 Sadhukathar Desh (1995)
 Sadhukathar Bagicha (1996)
 Sadhukathar Tupula (1996)
 Dhekura Kukurar Club (2019)

Nonfiction
 (editor) Assam: Myriad Perspectives (Spectrum, 2014)
 My Journey Through Cancer (2022)

Personal life
Duara died at age 57 after being diagnosed with ovarian cancer. She is survived by her husband and two children.

See also
 Literature from North East India
 Indian English literature

References

External links
 'The Wait', a short story by Srutimala Duara

1960s births
Year of birth missing
2023 deaths
20th-century Indian short story writers
Novelists from Assam
21st-century Indian short story writers
Indian women novelists
Assamese-language writers
English-language writers from India
Indian women children's writers
Indian children's writers
Indian women short story writers
20th-century Indian novelists
21st-century Indian novelists
20th-century Indian women writers
21st-century Indian women writers
Women writers from Assam